The Party: The Secret World of China's Communist Rulers  is a book written by Richard McGregor, a former bureau chief of the Financial Times in China. It was published by Penguin Books on June 25, 2010.

References

External links

Richard McGregor's 'The Party' reveals the secret world of  China's  communists
Market Maoism, reviewed by Isabel Hilton on New Statesman
Lowly Institute Distinguished Speaker Series - Richard McGregor MP3(21 MB)
The Morning Interview: Mornings with Margaret Throsby MP3
Conversation with NY Times January 21, 2011 Book Chat on The Party
Google Books link to The Party
Washington Post review
The Daily Beast.com review of The Party July 23, 2010

Books about China
Book censorship in China
2010 non-fiction books
Censored books